Theodore Cleanthis Beniades (November 17, 1922 – October 24, 2014) was an American character actor of screen and stage who was best known for appearing in Brian De Palma's Scarface as the undercover police officer Seidelbaum.

Beniades was born on November 17, 1922, in New York City, the son of Greek immigrants Mary and Cleanthis Beniades. He joined the United States Army on March 1, 1943, as an enlisted soldier and was discharged in September 1944. After his military service, he began studying acting at the Dramatic Workshop in New York. He appeared in such films as The Odd Couple, Serpico and The Next Man and such television series as Dark Shadows, N.Y.P.D., The Jackie Gleason Show, Kojak, The Andros Targets, and The Equalizer. Beniades died on October 24, 2014, at the age of 91.

Filmography

References

External links 

1922 births
2014 deaths
American people of Greek descent
Male actors from New York City
American male film actors
American male television actors
American male stage actors
United States Army soldiers
United States Army personnel of World War II
20th-century American male actors